Toplessness refers to the state in which a woman's breasts, including her areolas and nipples, are exposed, especially in a public place or in a visual medium. The male equivalent is barechestedness, also commonly called shirtlessness.

Exposed breasts were and are normal in many indigenous societies. However, western countries have social norms around female modesty, often enforced by legal statutes, that require women to cover their breasts in public. In many jurisdictions, women who expose their breasts can be prosecuted for indecent exposure, although public breastfeeding is often exempted from public indecency laws.

Social norms around toplessness vary by context and location. Throughout history, women's breasts have been featured in art and visual media, from painting and sculpture to film and photography, and such representations are generally defended on the grounds of artistic merit. Toplessness may also be deemed acceptable on educational, medical, or political grounds. At many beaches and resort destinations, especially in Europe and Australia, women are either formally or informally permitted to sunbathe topless. However, societies tend to view breast exposure unfavorably, and subject it to stringent regulations or prohibitions, if its intent is perceived to be sexual arousal.

Usage and connotations 

The word "topless" usually refers to a woman who is naked above her waist or hips or, at least, whose breasts are exposed to public view, specifically including her areolas and nipples. It can describe a woman who appears, poses, or performs with at least her breasts exposed, such as a "topless model" or "topless dancer", or to an activity undertaken while not wearing a top, such as "topless sunbathing". It may indicate a designated location where one might expect to find women not wearing tops, such as a "topless beach" or "topless bar". It can also be used to describe a garment that is specifically designed to reveal the breasts, such as the "topless swimsuit" (also known as the monokini) designed by Rudi Gernreich in the 1960s.

The word "topless" may carry sexual or exhibitionist connotations. Because of this, advocates of women's legal right to uncover their breasts wherever men may go bare-chested have adopted the alternative term "topfree", which is not perceived to have these connotations.

Barechestedness

Barechestedness is the state of a man or boy wearing no clothes above the waist, exposing the upper torso. Bare male chests are generally considered acceptable in or around the house; at beaches, swimming pools and sunbathing areas; when exercising outside in hot weather; and in certain outdoor construction work settings. However, some stores and restaurants have a "no shirt, no service" rule to prevent barechested men from coming inside. While going barechested at outdoor activities may be acceptable, it is taboo at office workplaces, churches and other formal settings.

In most societies, male barechestedness is much more common than female toplessness, even among children.  Exposure of the male pectoral muscles is often considered to be far less taboo than of the female breasts, despite some considering them equally erogenous. Male barechestedness is often ascribed to practical reasons such as heat, or the ability to move the body without being restricted by an upper body garment. In several sports it is encouraged or even obligatory to be barechested. Barechestedness may also be used as a display of power, or to draw attention to oneself, especially if the upper body muscles are well-developed.

Traditional societies 

Attitudes towards toplessness have varied considerably across cultures and over time. The lack of clothing above the waist for both females and males was the norm in traditional cultures of North America, Africa, Australia and the Pacific Islands until the arrival of Christian missionaries, and it continues to be the norm in many indigenous cultures today. The practice was also the norm in various Asian cultures before Muslim expansion in the 13th and 14th centuries.

India

In certain parts of northern India, some women did not wear an upper garment except during winter before the Muslim conquest of India. Women and men typically wore an antriya on the lower body and were nude from the waist up, aside from pieces of jewelry. This was the standard form of dress unless women opted to wear a sari, in which case they covered their upper bodies with a robe.

Toplessness was the norm for women among several communities of South India  and Sri Lanka until the 19th or early 20th century. Such communities included the Tamils along the Coromandel Coast, Tiyan and other peoples on the Malabar Coast, Kadar of Cochin Island, Toda, Cheruman (Pulayar), Kuruba, Koraga, Nicobarese, and the Uriya.

Thailand
In Thailand, the government of Field Marshal Plaek Pibulsonggram issued a series of cultural standards between 1939 and 1942. Mandate 10 issued on 8 September 1941 instructed Thai people to not appear in public places "without being appropriately dressed". Inappropriate dress included "wearing no shirt or wearing a wraparound cloth". Before the introduction of Western dress codes, Thai women were depicted both fully clothed and topless in public. Until the early 20th century, women from northern Thailand wore a long tube-skirt (Pha-Sin), tied high above their waist and below their breasts, which were uncovered. In the late 19th century the influence of missionaries and modernization under King Chulalongkorn encouraged local women to cover their breasts with blouses.

Laos
In Laos, Frenchman Henri Mouhot took a picture in 1858 of Laotian women that depicted virgins with clothed breasts and married women with their entire breasts exposed in public, because the baring of breasts for breastfeeding was considered to be nonsexual.

Indonesia

In the Indonesian archipelago, toplessness was the norm among the Dayak, Javanese, and the Balinese people of Indonesia before the introduction of Islam and contact with Western cultures. In Javanese and Balinese societies, women had gone topless to work or rest comfortably. Among the Dayak, only big-breasted women or married women with sagging breasts covered their breasts because their breasts interfered with their work.

Middle East

In most Middle Eastern countries, toplessness has not been socially accepted since at least the beginning of Islam (7th century), because of Islamic standards for female modesty. However, toplessness was the norm in some pre-Islamic cultures in Arabia, Egypt, Assyria and Mesopotamia. Tunisia and Egypt are an exception among Arabic states, allowing foreign tourists to swim topless on private beaches.

Africa

Among Himba women of northern Namibia and Hamar of southern Ethiopia, besides other traditional groups in Africa, the social norm is for women to be bare-breasted. Female toplessness can also constitute an important aspect of indigenous cultural celebrations. For example, in the annual Reed Dance festival mature girls between the ages of 16 and 20 dance topless before the Zulu king.

Australia
Traditional topless practices can lead to cross-cultural and legal conflict. In 2004, Australian police banned members of the Papunya community from using a public park in the city of Alice Springs to practice a traditional Aboriginal dance that included topless women.

Korea
In the 16th century, women's jeogori (an upper garment) was long, wide, and covered the waist. The length of women's jeogori gradually shortened: it was approximately 65 cm in the 16th century, 55 cm in the 17th century, 45 cm in the 18th century, and 28 cm in the 19th century, with some as short as 14.5 cm. A heoritti (허리띠) or jorinmal (졸잇말) was worn to cover the breasts. The trend of wearing a short jeogori with a heoritti was started by the gisaeng and soon spread to women of the upper class. Among women of the common and lowborn classes, a practice emerged in which they revealed their breasts after childbirth to proudly indicate that they had given birth to a son, i.e., a male heir.

Travelers like the American Harry A. Franck remarked that they "displayed to the public gaze exactly that portion of the torso which the women of most nations take pains to conceal."

South Pacific
In the South Pacific, toplessness was common prior to contact with Western missionaries, but is less common today. On the French territory of Moorea, toplessness is common. In the Marshall Islands, women were traditionally topless before contact with Western missionaries and still do not sexually objectify female breasts as is common in much of Western society. Marshall Island women typically swim in their muumuus which today are made of a fine polyester that dries quickly. Wearing of bikinis and one-piece, breast-covering swimsuits in the Marshall Islands is mainly seen at Western, restricted-access beaches and swimming pools like those at private resorts or on United States government facilities on the Kwajalein Atoll within the Ronald Reagan Ballistic Missile Defense Test Site.

In Western culture 
In most Western societies, it is a cultural norm for girls after puberty, if not earlier, to have their breasts covered especially while in a public place, as an act of modesty. At least, it is not culturally acceptable for women to expose their nipples and areolas in public. Though many women do not regard their breasts as sexual, most would not go against the social norm, let alone challenge various laws that cover toplessness. Until recent times, women who went topless in a public place may have been cited for indecent exposure, lewdness or similar laws. Women and the law in most Western countries generally do not regard breasts as indecent. A small number of women campaign for what they call topfreedom, seeking to change these laws. The strictness of the etiquette varies depending on the social context. For example, at specific cultural events the norm may be relaxed, such as at Fantasy Fest, at Mardi Gras in New Orleans and at the Carnaval in Rio de Janeiro. The same may also apply at designated topless beaches.

Public breast-baring fashions 
In many European societies between the Renaissance and the 19th century, exposed breasts were acceptable while a woman's bared legs, ankles or shoulders were considered risqué. During the Renaissance, many artists were strongly influenced by classical Greek styles and culture, and images of nude and semi-nude subjects in many forms proliferated in art, sculpture and architecture of the period. In aristocratic and upper-class circles the display of breasts also invoked associations with classical Greek nude sculptures and art and a classic breast shape was at times regarded as a status symbol, as a sign of beauty, wealth or social position. To maintain youthful-looking bosoms women could employ wet nurses to breastfeed their children.

Breast-baring female fashions have been traced to 15th-century courtesan Agnès Sorel, mistress to Charles VII of France, whose gowns in the French court sometimes exposed one or both of her breasts. (Jean Fouquet's portrayal of the Virgin Mary with her left breast uncovered is believed to have taken Sorel as a model.) Aristocratic women sought to immortalise their breasts in paint, as in the case of Simonetta Vespucci, whose portrait with exposed breasts was painted by Piero di Cosimo in c. 1480. During the 16th century, women's fashions displaying their breasts were common in society, from Queens to common prostitutes, and emulated by all classes.

Similar fashions became popular in England during the 17th century when they were worn by Queen Mary II and by Henrietta Maria, wife of Charles I of England, for whom architect Inigo Jones designed a masque costume that fully revealed both of her breasts.

In a survey of 190 different societies, researches found that very few associated exposed breasts with sexuality, but that there was an insistence that women conceal their breasts. Different standards apply to art, with one example being the dome of the United States Capitol featuring an 1865 fresco depicting goddesses with their breasts exposed.

Social attitudes 
Although some social attitudes to increased body exposure began to soften during the late 1960s, contemporary Western societies still generally view toplessness unfavorably. During a short period in 1964, "topless" dress designs appeared at fashion shows, but those who wore the dresses in public found themselves arrested on indecency charges. However, toplessness has come to be a feature in contemporary haute couture fashion shows.

A wide-ranging review of 190 different societies during 1951 found that few insisted that women conceal their breasts. In Europe, topless swimming and sunbathing on public beaches has become socially acceptable. In 1994–95, Australian researchers asked 118 college-age students to rate the behavior of women who go topless on an 8-point scale, ranging from "Women should have the same right to topless as men" to "Topless women are exhibitionists". They found that 88% of Australian university students of either gender considered it acceptable for women to go topless on public beaches, although they felt that women exposing their breasts in other contexts, such as public parks, was inappropriate. They did not find a correlation between exposed breasts and sexuality in social situations.

A more recent study of 116 college-age women in Australia found that those who had gone topless were more accepting of toplessness generally, more sexual, and had higher self-esteem and higher body image. In contemporary society, the extent to which a woman may expose her breasts depends on social and cultural context. Women's swimsuits and bikinis commonly reveal the tops and sides of the breasts. Displaying cleavage is considered permissible in many settings, and is even a sign of elegance and sophistication on many formal social occasions, but it may be prohibited by dress codes in settings such as workplaces and schools, where sexualized displays of the female breast may be considered inappropriate.  In a number of cultures, including Europe and other Westernized countries outside the United States, there are fewer social restrictions against sunbathing or swimming topless. Despite being illegal or socially proscribed in many places in the United States, topless beaches have majority legislative support in some areas.

In Canada, a poll in 1992 found that 38% favored general female public toplessness. Following that survey, several legal rulings in Canadian courts from 1996 to 2000 made public toplessness legal, but very few women go topless in public.

Some cultures have even begun to expand social prohibitions on female toplessness to prepubescent and even infant girls. This trend toward covering the female nipple from infancy onward is particularly noticeable in the United States, Eastern Asia and the Middle East, but is much less common in Europe.

Legality 

Around the world, it is common for women to breastfeed in public. In the United States during the 1990s and later, there were a number of legal incidents where women were harassed or cited for exposing their breasts while breastfeeding in public. A public backlash spurred legislators in some jurisdictions to specifically legalize public breastfeeding. The federal government passed a law in 1999 that specifically provides that "a woman may breastfeed her child at any location in a Federal building or on Federal property, if the woman and her child are otherwise authorized to be present at the location." Some women have engaged in acts of "lactivism", or acts of politically motivated public breastfeeding, to assert these rights.

In many indigenous, non-Western cultures it is generally acceptable for both men and women to go without clothing that covers the torso. Female toplessness can also be a traditional aspect in indigenous cultural celebrations. However, this can lead to cross-cultural and legal conflict. During 2004, Australian police banned female members of the Papunya community from using a public park in the city of Alice Springs to practice a traditional Aboriginal dance while topless.

Many societies consider women who expose their nipples and areolas as immodest and contrary to social norms. Most jurisdictions do not have laws prohibiting toplessness directly, but in many jurisdictions a topless woman may be socially or officially harassed or cited for public lewdness, indecent exposure, public indecency or disorderly conduct. Enforcement of such standards is subject to community standards, which are subject to change over time. Most prosecutions commence with a complaint being made to the police by a member of the public, and a judge would be required to adjudicate as to the indecency etc. of the exposure.

In the United States, GoTopless.org claims that women have the same constitutional right to be bare chested in public places as men. They further claim constitutional equality between men and women on being topless in public. They have successfully joined in legal challenges that have resulted in laws permitting women to expose their breasts just as men do in New York State and in Ontario, Canada. In 2009, they used 26 August (Women's Equality Day), as a day of national protest. The topfreedom movement has claimed success in a few instances in persuading federal courts in the United States to overturn some state laws on the basis of sex discrimination, arguing that a woman should be free to expose her chest in any context in which a man can expose his. A federal lawsuit filed in the 10th Circuit (Colorado), was decided at the appellate level. In September 2019, after spending over US$300,000, the city of Fort Collins decided to stop defending their ordinance and repeal it. This effectively gave females of all ages the right to go topless wherever males legally can in the jurisdiction of the 10th Circuit, which includes Wyoming, Utah, Colorado, New Mexico, Kansas and Oklahoma.

In March 2008, after a year-long campaign by a pressure group, the Topless Front, Copenhagen's Culture and Leisure Committee concluded that there were no regulations against topless bathing by women in public swimbaths, thus no reason to disallow it. Also in 2008, the city council in Vancouver, British Columbia, location of the World Naked Bike Ride, gave women the right to go topless in public, not solely at swimming pools and beaches.

In 2009, members of the Swedish feminist organization Bara Bröst ("Just Breasts" or "Bare Breasts") went topless at the city pools in Malmö, Sweden. This triggered a vote by the city's sports and recreation committee, which backed away from requiring women to wear a top, only stipulating that everyone must wear a swimsuit. Their ruling allows women in Sweden to swim topless in Malmö's public swimming pools. "We don't decide what men should do with their torso, why then do women have to listen to the men. Moreover, many men have larger breasts than women", the committee chair said.

As a form of liberation 

While an exposed breast in public can have many associated connotations, some women in America today argue the exposed breast is a symbol of liberation.  They speak against the proposed notion that their rightful place was below their male counterparts. Throughout the late 20th century, more and more women began to link the struggle for female equality and the repossession of the female body. This can be especially seen in the work of Second Wave Feminists beginning in the early 1960s.

The reaction to exposed breast as a symbol of liberation was two-sided. Women who took part in the movement expressed their desire to turn attention away from the excessive eroticization of the female body in American popular culture to more essential societal needs. Opposition to the braless movement ironically viewed it as an attack to American morals and public decency. The bralessness movement evolved into a bare-breasted movement, which became another way for women to "thumb one's nose at society". While some women exposed their breasts individually, there was also an upsurge in topless demonstrations used to gather public attention for women's issues such as pornography and sexism. The sexualization of the breast is found only in a few Western nations, and this, many women argue, causes women to turn to plastic surgery and view their breasts as determinants of beauty rather than potentially nourishing life forces. Because of this, women are able to liberate their breasts as a way to gain attention, make political statements, and combat breast exposure laws' reinforcement of the supposed uncontrollable seductive nature of women's breasts.

As a form of protest 

In Western countries, toplessness in public often generates media coverage, leading some female political demonstrators to deliberately expose their breasts in public to draw media and public attention to their cause. For example, in January 2012, three members of the Ukrainian protest group FEMEN attracted worldwide media attention after they staged a topless protest at the World Economic Forum in Davos, Switzerland.

Topless swimwear 

Toplessness in a public place is most commonly practised or encountered near water, either as part of a swimming activity or sunbathing. The introduction of the bikini in 1946 and increasingly common glamour shots of popular actresses and models on either side of the Atlantic wearing the minimal swimsuit design played a large part in bringing the bikini and sunbathing into the mainstream.

In 1964, fashion designer Rudi Gernreich went further and designed and produced a topless swimsuit, which he called the "monokini" in the United States. Gernreich's monokini consisted primarily of a brief, close-fitting bottom that "extended from the midriff to the upper thigh" and was "held up by shoestring laces that make a halter around the neck". It first appeared in print in Look magazine, introducing the concept of a topless swimsuit into commercial fashion. He later said he did not really mean for the swimsuit to be popular as it was, but rather as a fantastical concept and prediction of the future. "[Women] drop their bikini tops already", he said, "so it seemed like the natural next step." A photograph of Peggy Moffitt, the famous model for the suit, appeared in Women's Wear Daily, Life and numerous other publications.

Despite the negative reaction of fashion critics and church officials, shoppers purchased about 3000 of his swimsuit design at $24 each that summer, though the only woman reported as having worn it to a beach in the United States was arrested. The novelty of the design caught significant attention. Life writer Shana Alexander noted in an article about the introduction of the monokini in July 1964, "One funny thing about toplessness is that it really doesn't have much to do with breasts. Breasts of course are not absurd; topless swimsuits are. Lately people keep getting the two things mixed up."

The topless swimsuit failed to catch on in the United States. The Soviet government called it "barbarism" and a sign of social "decay". The New York City Police Department was strictly instructed to arrest any woman wearing a swimsuit by the commissioner of parks. In Chicago, a 19-year-old female beachgoer was fined US$100 for wearing a topless swimsuit on a public beach. Copious coverage of the event helped to send the image of exposed breasts across the world. Women's clubs and the church were particularly active in their condemnation. In Italy and Spain, the Catholic Church warned against the topless fashion. In France in 1964, Roger Frey led the prosecution of the use of the monokini, describing it as "a public offense against the sense of decency, punishable according to article 330 of the penal code. Consequently, the police chiefs must employ the services of the police so that the women who wear this bathing suit in public places are prosecuted." At St. Tropez on the French Riviera, where toplessness later became the norm, the mayor ordered police to ban toplessness and to watch over the beach via helicopter. Jean-Luc Godard, a founding mover of French New Wave cinema, incorporated a shot of a woman in a topless swimsuit on the Riviera into his film A Married Woman, but it was edited out by the censors.

A number of Caribbean locations, especially those that were formerly French and Dutch colonies, permit nude and topless sunbathing, like the French West Indies islands of St. Barths, Guadeloupe, Martinique, and St. Maarten.

Topless sunbathing slowly spread to other Western countries throughout Europe and Australia, many of which now allow topless sunbathing on some or all of their beaches, either through legal statute or by generally accepted practice, and beaches were designated for nude or topless bathers. A topless, or top-optional, beach differs from a nude beach in that beach goers of both sexes are required to keep their genital area covered, although females have the option to remove their tops without fearing legal prosecution or official harassment.

In the late 2000s, a number of French newspapers reported that the number of women sunbathing topless on French beaches had markedly declined, and that younger French women had become more disapproving of exposing breasts in public. The French edition of Elle magazine published a cover story in 2014, "La Fin Du Topless Sur La Plage?" ("The End of Toplessness on the Beach?"), that offered several reasons for the decline, including concerns about skin cancer, sexualised representations of topless women, the use of bare breasts in political activism, and concerns about topless images being posted on social media. A 2019 survey of 5,000 women from five European countries found that topless sunbathing was still popular in Spain, with 48 percent of women aged between 18 and 49 having engaged in the practice, down just 1 percent since the survey was last conducted in 2016. The numbers declined more significantly between 2016 and 2019 for German women (from 41 to 34 percent), French women (29 to 22 percent), British women (26 to 19 percent) and Italian women (20 to 15 percent). Topless sunbathing was less common among young women, with 13 percent of French women aged 18–29 saying in 2019 that they removed their tops on the beach, compared to 25 percent of French women aged 40–49. Surveys show considerable resistance to topless sunbathing in other European countries. Sweden's tolerance for the practice fell after a brief period of popularity in the 1970s and into the 80s. Many of the Swedes surveyed by Skyscanner in 2010 found public toplessness "indecent" and "offensive".

In popular culture and the arts 

The French have traditionally been relaxed with nudity and toplessness in entertainment, and dancers and actresses performed topless during the 1910s and beyond in musical theater and cinema. Toplessness in entertainment has survived to this day at the Folies Bergère and the Moulin Rouge. Some female groups have also performed topless, such as the two female groups called The Ladybirds (one in San Francisco (es) and another in Copenhagen (es)), which performed topless in the late 1960s.

Women are also at times employed in adult-only venues to perform or pose topless in forms of commercial erotic entertainment. Such venues can range from downmarket strip clubs and topless bars to upmarket cabarets, such as the Moulin Rouge. Topless entertainment may also include competitions such as wet T-shirt contests, especially during spring break in the United States, in which women display their breasts through translucent wet fabric—and may end up removing their T-shirts in front of the audience.

Female toplessness has also become somewhat common during Mardi Gras in New Orleans during which women "flash" (briefly expose) their breasts in return for strings of plastic beads, and at Carnaval in Rio de Janeiro, where floats occasionally feature topless women.

Pasties are sometimes worn by erotic dancers or burlesque entertainers to give the impression of toplessness while avoiding prosecution under local public indecency laws which prohibit exposure of the nipple and areolas. To stay within the law, liquid latex pasties may be used. Pasties may be worn by neo-burlesque performers and are also found in night clubs, fetish parties and parades, such as Pride Parades.

Media and photography 
In many Western cultures today, images of topless women are regularly featured in magazines, calendars, and other print media, often covering their breasts in a "handbra", that is, the use of the woman's hands or arms to cover their breasts, especially the nipples and areolas. In the United Kingdom, following a tradition established by the British newspaper The Sun in 1970, several mainstream tabloid newspapers featured topless female models on their third page, known as Page 3 girls, although this is no longer the case.  The subject of glamour photography is often a topless woman.

Photographers such as Jock Sturges and Bill Henson have been prosecuted or been embroiled in controversy for producing images of topless teen girls as part of their ongoing work.

Cinema 

In the 1920s, nudity, including toplessness, was featured in some Hollywood silent films as well as on the stage, though not without objections from various groups, and several jurisdictions in the United States and elsewhere set up film censorship boards to censor films. In the 1930s, the Hays Code brought an end in Hollywood films to nudity in all its forms. To remain within the censors' guidelines or community standards of decency and modesty, breasts of actresses in an otherwise topless scene would be covered, especially the nipples and areolas, with their hands (using a "handbra" stance), arms, towel, pasties, some other object, or the angle of the body in relation to the camera.

Film making in other centres were not subject to the Hays Code, but were subject to various national censorship regimes. The Italian film Era lui... sì! sì! (1951), for example, also had a French version which included topless actresses in the harem scene. This version was especially made for the French market, where censorship was less rigorous than in Italy. Social and official attitudes to toplessness and nudity had eased by the 1960s and the Hays Code came under repeated challenge. For example, in Mutiny on the Bounty (1962) all Tahitian girls were topless and there was a long native dance scene, though the topless female dancers' breasts were covered by leis. The historical epic film Hawaii (1966) also featured scenes of topless native girls, their breasts being strategically covered by leis.

In 1968 the Hays Code was replaced by the MPAA film rating system. Women now appear topless in mainstream cinema, although usually somewhat briefly. Film critic Roger Ebert argued that there was a double standard in relation to the toplessness of "native" women. He wrote that the producers of Rapa-Nui (1994), which featured repeated scenes of bare-breasted native women, got away with ongoing toplessness because of the women's brown skin:

Besides those actresses who have appeared nude or partially nude in films, it has also become increasingly common for actresses to appear topless in movies. Notable actresses who have appeared topless include Jane Fonda (Coming Home, 1978), Julie Andrews (S.O.B., 1981), Kate Winslet (Titanic, 1997), Gwyneth Paltrow (Shakespeare in Love, 1998), Reese Witherspoon (Twilight, 1998), Rene Russo (The Thomas Crown Affair, 1999), Katie Holmes (The Gift, 2000), and Halle Berry (Swordfish, 2001). In an interview in March 2007, Halle Berry said that her toplessness in Swordfish was "gratuitous" to the movie, but that she needed to do the scene to get over her fear of nudity, and that it was the best thing she did for her career. Having overcome her inhibitions, she went on to a role in Monster's Ball, which included a nude scene and which won her an Oscar for Best Actress. Some actresses prefer not to expose their breasts and use a body double.

Pasties were and may still be worn by some actresses while filming an otherwise apparently topless or nude scene, which is not caught by the camera angle.

Topless dancing 

On 12 June 1964, the San Francisco Chronicle featured a woman wearing a monokini with her exposed breasts on its first page. Two weeks later on 22 June 1964, Carol Doda started dancing topless wearing a monokini (designed by Rudi Gernreich) at the Condor Club in San Francisco's North Beach district. Her debut as a topless dancer was featured in Playboy magazine in April 1965. Doda was the first modern topless dancer in the United States, renewing the burlesque era of the early 20th century in the U.S. San Francisco Mayor John Shelley said, "topless is at the bottom of porn." Within a few days, women were baring their breasts in many of the clubs lining San Francisco's Broadway St., ushering in the era of the topless bar.

San Francisco public officials tolerated the topless bars until 22 April 1965, when the San Francisco Police Department arrested Doda on indecency charges. Hundreds of protesters gathered outside the police department, calling for release of both Doda and free speech activist Mario Savio, held in the same station. Doda rapidly became a symbol of sexual freedom, while topless restaurants, shoeshine parlors, ice-cream stands and girl bands proliferated in San Francisco and elsewhere. Journalist Earl Wilson wrote in his syndicated column, "Are we ready for girls in topless gowns? Heck, we may not even notice them." English designers created topless evening gowns inspired by the idea. The San Francisco Examiner published a real estate advertisement that promised "bare top swimsuits are possible here".

The arts 
The artifacts in the Ancient Siam open-air museum near Bangkok depict Thai women topless. The Ramakien Mural representing the epic lives of the Thai people found at the Wat Phra Kaew Temple depict women wearing only a skirt in public.

As a result of the Renaissance, in many European societies artists were strongly influenced by classical Greek styles and culture. As a result, images of nude and semi-nude subjects in many forms proliferated in art and sculpture.

During the Victorian era, French Orientalist painters such as Jean-Léon Gérôme presented an idealized depiction of female toplessness in Muslim harem baths, while Eugène Delacroix, a French romantic artist, invoked images of liberty as a topless woman.

In religion 
In European pre-historic societies, sculptures of female figures with pronounced or highly exaggerated breasts were common. A typical example is the so-called Venus of Willendorf, one of many Venus figurines from the Paleolithic era with ample hips and bosom. Artifacts such as bowls, rock carvings and sacred statues with breasts have been recorded from 15,000 BC up to late antiquity all across Europe, North Africa and the Middle East. Many female deities representing love and fertility were associated with breasts and breast milk. Figures of the Phoenician goddess Astarte were represented as pillars studded with breasts. Isis, an Egyptian goddess who represented, among many other things, ideal motherhood, was often portrayed as suckling pharaohs, thereby confirming their divine status as rulers. Even certain male deities representing regeneration and fertility were occasionally depicted with breast-like appendices, such as the river god Hapy who was considered to be responsible for the annual overflowing of the Nile. Female breasts were also prominent in the Minoan civilization in the form of the famous Snake Goddess statuettes.

In Ancient Greece there were several cults worshiping the "Kourotrophos", the suckling mother, represented by goddesses such as Gaia, Hera and Artemis. The worship of deities symbolized by the female breast in Greece became less common during the first millennium. The popular adoration of female goddesses decreased significantly during the rise of the Greek city states, a legacy which was passed on to the later Roman Empire.

During the middle of the first millennium BC, Greek culture experienced a gradual change in the perception of female breasts. Women in art were covered in clothing from the neck down, including female goddesses like Athena, the patron of Athens who represented heroic endeavor. There were exceptions: Aphrodite, the goddess of love, was more frequently portrayed fully nude, though in postures that were intended to portray shyness or modesty, a portrayal that has been compared to modern pin-ups by historian Marilyn Yalom. Although nude men were depicted standing upright, most depictions of female nudity in Greek art occurred "usually with drapery near at hand and with a forward-bending, self-protecting posture". A popular legend at the time was of the Amazons, a tribe of fierce female warriors who socialized with men only for procreation and even removed one breast to become better warriors. The legend was a popular motif in art during Greek and Roman antiquity and served as an antithetical cautionary tale.

See also 

 Bralessness
 Breast fetishism
 Décolletage
 FEMEN
 Free the nipple
 Gender equality
 Go Topless Day
 Naturism
 Nipple piercing
 Outdoor Co-ed Topless Pulp Fiction Appreciation Society
 Pasties
 Sex-positive feminism
 Women's Equality Day

References

Bibliography

External links 

 "Revealing Mary" essay in History Today on popular topless depictions of Queen Mary II

Breast
Nudity
Sex laws
Thorax (human anatomy)
Social conventions